Patrick Kearins  (14 July 1894 - 7 September 1974) was a Member of Parliament for , in the North Island of New Zealand.

Biography

Early life and career
Kearins was born 14 July 1894 to Patrick Kearins. He became a farmer in Kopaki and in October 1923 he married Kathleen Mary Levett. In 1939 he was appointed a member of the Board of Governors of Massey Agricultural College.

Member of Parliament

Warren Freer described Kearins as a "quiet and sincere" parliamentarian.

In 1947 Kearins was one of three Labour MPs who supported Frank Langstone's contentious proposal that the government make the state-owned Bank of New Zealand the sole legal issuer of bank credit over loans and overdrafts in an attempt to secure state control over the means of exchange. The proposal was rejected as too radical however.

In 1953 Kearins crossed the floor of parliament and voted with the National government to support the Licensing Amendment Bill (No. 2). This Bill proposed that the licensing of the King Country, part of Kearins' electorate, be subject to a referendum.

Later in 1953, following an electoral redistribution, Kearins' electorate of Waimarino was abolished and a new electorate of  established in its place. Rotorua contained the northern part of his former electorate, including the towns of Taupo (which was previously located in Waimarino), Rotorua, and Tokoroa. However, at the candidate selection for Rotorua, Ray Boord won the nomination and was subsequently elected, and "Labour lost its only farming voice... sacrificed by the party machine".

Later life and death
Kearins later served as Mayor of Taihape, first elected in 1956. He was awarded the Queen Elizabeth II Coronation Medal in 1953, and was appointed a Member of the Order of the British Empire, for services to local affairs, in the 1970 Queen's Birthday Honours.

He died on 7 September 1974, aged 80. He was survived by his wife and daughter.

Notes

References

|-

1894 births
1974 deaths
New Zealand Labour Party MPs
New Zealand Members of the Order of the British Empire
Mayors of places in Manawatū-Whanganui
New Zealand farmers
Members of the New Zealand House of Representatives
New Zealand MPs for North Island electorates